George Drummond Bone (August 28, 1874 – May 26, 1918) was a Major League Baseball player. He was a switch hitter, and threw right-handed.

Bone was born and died in New Haven, Connecticut.

External links
Baseball Reference.com page

1874 births
1918 deaths
Major League Baseball shortstops
Milwaukee Brewers (1901) players
Baseball players from New Haven, Connecticut
Minor league baseball managers
New Haven Edgewoods players
Meriden Bulldogs players
Syracuse Stars (minor league baseball) players
Pawtucket Tigers players
Manchester Manchesters players
Pawtucket Colts players
New Haven Blues players
Milwaukee Creams players
Meriden Silverites players